The Macau national under-17 football team is the under-17 football (soccer) team of Macau and is controlled by the Macau Football Association.

Competitive record

FIFA U-17 World Cup record

AFC U-16 Championship record

See also
 Sports in Macau

References 

u17
Asian national under-17 association football teams